Medal of Honor: Infiltrator is a top-down third-person shooter video game, the sixth installment in the Medal of Honor series, and the second game for the Game Boy Advance. The game was developed by Netherock Ltd. and published by EA Games in North America in November 2003, and in Europe and Japan in December 2003.

Gameplay
In the game, the player takes the role of Corporal Jake Murphy, completing five missions to defeat the Axis in some of most famous battles in World War II. The game features 15 missions spread across three theaters including 5 missions behind enemy lines. Infiltrator is technically both a third-person shooter with a fixed view and a first-person shooter blended together. Through the use of a link cable, Infiltrator supports up to two players. It also features a Nintendo GameCube connectivity option, which connects both the game and the GameCube version of Medal of Honor: Rising Sun using the GameCube - Game Boy Advance Link Cable allowing the Game Boy Advance to be used as an in-game map. Upon completing all of the missions, the player unlocks Survival Mode, where the objective is to see how long the player can survive and then try to beat their high score. Completing the game with bonus objectives fulfilled unlocks "Max GI Mode" where the player must complete every mission continuously without turning off the game system.

Reception

The game received "favorable" reviews according to video game review aggregator Metacritic. IGN's Craig Harris noted that "the final product is a game well on the other end of the quality spectrum from last year's dud" and "has a great feel all the way through." Frank Provo of GameSpot stated that Infiltrator "is a fun handheld game that should please anyone who's looking for an action game with teeth."

References

External links

2003 video games
Electronic Arts games
Infiltrator
Game Boy Advance games
Game Boy Advance-only games
Games with GameCube-GBA connectivity
Video games scored by Allister Brimble
Video games developed in the United Kingdom
Video games set in France
Video games set in Morocco
Video games set in Norway
Video games set in Tunisia
Video games with isometric graphics
World War II video games